Nitin Jairam Gadkari (born 27 May 1957) is an Indian politician from Maharashtra who is the current Minister for Road Transport & Highways in the Government of India. He is also the longest serving Minister for Road Transport & Highways currently running his tenure for over 8 years. Gadkari earlier served as the President of the Bharatiya Janata Party (BJP) from 2009 to 2013. He is also known for his work as the Public Works Department Minister of the State of Maharashtra, where, under his leadership, a series of roads, highways and flyovers across the state were constructed – including the Mumbai-Pune Expressway, India's first six-lane concrete, high-speed expressway. He currently represents the Nagpur constituency in the Lok Sabha, and is a lawyer by occupation. During the cabinet reshuffle on 7 July 2021 the portfolio for Ministry of MSME which was under him was reassigned to Narayan Rane, another BJP MP from Maharashtra as a part of cabinet expansion. In popular culture he is remembered as the "Highwayman of India" for the intensive road infrastructure improvements, per the World Economic Forum, planned and delivered in his tenure in India.

Early Life
Nitin Gadkari was born into a Marathi family in Nagpur, India to Jairam Gadkari and Bhanutai Gadkari on 27 May 1957. During his adolescence, he worked for the Bharatiya Janata Yuva Morcha and the student union Akhil Bharatiya Vidyarthi Parishad. He completed M.Com. and L.L.B. from Nagpur University.

Political career
Nitin Gadkari served as the Minister of Public Works Department (PWD) of the Government of Maharashtra from 1995 to 1999 and restructured it from top to bottom. He has served as the president of the Maharashtra state unit of BJP.

Gadkari strongly supported privatisation while he campaigned for investments in infrastructure from private firms. He addressed several meetings between private investors, contractors, builders and various trade organisations and diverted large amounts of budgeted projects towards privatisation. Subsequently, the state government allocated  7 billion for rural connectivity. Over the next four years, all-weather road connectivity in Maharashtra was extended to 98% of the population. The project aimed to connect 13,736 remote villages which remained unconnected since independence by road. It also helped ameliorate malnutrition in remote Melghat-Dharni area of Amravati district, which previously had no access to medical aid, ration or educational facilities.

The Union Government appointed him as the Chairman of National Rural Road Development Committee. After a series of meetings and studies, Gadkari submitted his report to the central government and gave the presentation to Atal Bihari Vajpayee, then Prime Minister of India. His new report was accepted and Pradhan Mantri Gram Sadak Yojana, an ambitious rural road connecting scheme worth ₹600 billion, was launched.
He received the Late Madhavrao Limaye Award by Public Library Nashik, for Most Efficient Member of Parliament for 2020-21.

Positions served
Minister, Govt of Maharashtra
Chairman, Purti Group of Companies
President, Bharatiya Janata Party, Maharashtra State
Leader of Opposition, Maharashtra Legislative Council
Former Minister for Public Works Department, Maharashtra State
Member of Legislative Council, Maharashtra State
Elected to the Maharashtra Govt. Legislative Council in 1989 from graduates constituency, Nagpur Region
Re-elected in 1990
Re-elected in 1996 and elected unopposed in 2002
Inducted in the Maharashtra State Government Cabinet as the Minister for Public Works on 27 May 1995
Member of the High Powered Committee for Privatisation, Government of Maharashtra
Chairman, Maharashtra State Road Development Corporation, India
Guardian Minister for Nagpur District, Govt. of Maharashtra
Chairman, Mining policy Implementation Committee, Govt. of Maharashtra
Chairman, Metropolis Beautification Committee, Govt. of Maharashtra
Leader of Opposition, Maharashtra Legislative Council, Chairman National Rural Road Development Committee
Chairman, Review Committee of CPWD, Govt. of India
State President of Bharatiya Janata Party, Maharashtra
National President of BJP, India

As Public Works Department (PWD) Minister, Maharashtra, 1996–99 

As PWD Minister of Maharashtra, Gadkari played a crucial role in expediting the construction of the Mumbai-Pune Expressway. In 1990, the Government of Maharashtra conducted feasibility studies for the new expressway to be operated on a toll basis, however, it was only after Gadkari took over as PWD Minister that the construction of this project was fast-tracked. Gadkari entrusted the work of the construction of Mumbai-Pune expressway to MSRDC in March 1997 on Build-Operate-Transfer basis with permission to collect toll for 30 years. The tender notice was published in leading newspapers all over India and also on the Internet. Due to the wide publicity, 133 tenders were sold and on 18 December 1997, 55 tenders were received. After technical and financial evaluation, tenders were accepted and work orders were given on 1 January 1998 to four contractors. Thereafter tenders for widening of the Khandala and Lonavala-Khandala bypass works were invited. The tenders were received on 24 August 1998 and orders were issued on 4 September 1998. The first sections of the Expressway opened in 2000, and the entire route was completed, opened to traffic and made fully operational from April 2002.

The other major achievement of Gadkari as state minister was the construction of 55 flyovers in Mumbai, which eased the city traffic problems significantly.

As President of BJP, 2009–2013
Gadkari was appointed the president of the BJP in December 2009. This was considering a tough phase for the BJP as the party had lost two successive Lok Sabha elections and needed a quick revamp.

In his book India Aspires, co-authored with Tuhin Sinha, Gadkari spells out his development ideas for the country in great detail. Increased institutional support to green energy, alternate fuel and effective waste management hold special importance in Gadkari's development plan. 

As party president, Gadkari, re-emphasised on legendary Jan Sangh leader Deen Dayal Upadhya's principles of Integral Humanism and Antyodaya (upliftment of the poor). At the same time, various cells were constituted within the party to regularly monitor the develop work undertaken by various BJP state governments and to come up with new policy inputs.

Gadkari resigned as party president in January 2013.

2014 and 2019 Lok Sabha elections
Gadkari contested 2014 Lok Sabha election successfully from Nagpur constituency and won. He retained his seat in 2019, defeating Nana Patole of Congress party by  margin.

Union Minister

Gadkari became the Minister of Road Transport and Highways and Minister of Shipping in May 2014. Out of the stalled projects he inherited, projects worth  were terminated and others worth  were put up for rebidding. He increased the pace of road creation in the country from 2 km/day to 16.5 km/day in his first year and to 21 km/day in the second year and end of 2018 30 km/day. He reserved an amount of one per cent of the total projects awarded in his tenure worth  for trees and beautification.

During the Second Modi ministry, Gadkari retained Ministry of Road Transport and Highways, while the Ministry of Shipping and Ministry of Water Resources, River Development and Ganga Rejuvenation were replaced with Ministry of Micro, Small and Medium Enterprises on 31 May 2019. Highway construction pace post 2019 was 36 km per day in 2020 and Gadkari aims to take it to 68 kms per day with a target of 25000 kms in 2022-23. In line with the vision of Atmanirbhar Bharat green fuel adoption and fuel self sufficiency Gadkari drove to the parliament in a hydrogen powered FCEV Toyota Mirai car. He asked people to opt for green fuel vehicles.

Gadkari, who was virtually present at the inauguration of the headquarters of the National Highways Authority of India (NHAI) on 28 October 2020, made a speech that was highly critical of the NHAI officials and bureaucracy.

Industrial career
During his career in politics, Gadkari set up a number of private industries and companies. These include –
 Poly sack Industrial Society Ltd – founder and chairman
 Nikhil Furniture and Appliances Pvt. Ltd – promoter and director
 Antyodaya Trust – founder and member
 Empress Employees Co-operative Paper Mills Ltd – founder and chairman
 Purti Power and Sugar Ltd / Purti Sakhar Karkhana Ltd – promoter

Gadkari has registered himself as an agriculturist for tax purposes. He also started a fruit export company under the banner of "Ketaki overseas Trading Company". He owns a total of 17 sugar plantations in Vidarbha under the banner of the Purti group. Nitin Gadkari floated the Purti Power and Sugar Ltd (now Purti Group) in 1995, when he started as PWD minister in Maharashtra. In 2012, the companies came into the media glare based on irregularities unearthed by RTI activist Anjali Damania, the Income Tax department investigated a number of firms that had invested in Purti, and found more than a dozen of these to be bogus addresses. Another three investing firms were found co-located with the Somani Group, but no one knew of these firms. Following this, Delhi CM Arvind Kejriwal amplified the allegations accusing Gadkari of irregularities. However, Kejriwal apologised unconditionally after Gadkari filed a defamation case against him.  

In 2010, when the Purti group had incurred losses of Rs. 640 million, the firm IRB, which had obtained hefty road contracts under Gadkari's term as PWD minister, loaned the group Rs. 1.64 billion, which was higher than Purthi's turnover of Rs. 1.45 billion. When questioned on Marathi channel IBN-Lokmat, about why he did not avail a loan from banks, Gadkari explained that the balance sheets of the company were not in a suitable state, so he had requested his friend Dattatray to help him out. Also, Gadkari's son Nikhil was allegedly a director with IRB at the time. Gadkari argued that there was nothing wrong in having contractors invest in one's firms.

The news of these allegations broke a few months before Gadkari was to seek re-election as president of the BJP. At the time, Gadkari was to address several rallies for the 2012 Himachal Pradesh Legislative Assembly election. India Today reported that BJP leader Shanta Kumar had suggested that Gadkari's presence was "affecting BJP's anti-corruption campaign." Subsequently, Gadkari cancelled his scheduled rallies at Bilaspur and Solan on 30 October.

In early 2013, in the elections for BJP president, for which Gadkari was "close to clinching a second innings" his chances unravelled with several senior leaders suggesting that the I-T indictment of the Purti groups investments had damaged his image, and Gadkari was not re-elected. Gadkari told the Times of India that he was stepping down until the inquiry proved him innocent. Some RSS functionaries have suggested that his exit was the result of infighting. Subsequently, Gadkari threatened the I-T officers, saying "when our party comes to power, there would be no Chidambaram or Sonia to save them (I-T officials)"; Gadkari said,"Earlier CBI was doing Congress's bidding and now the I-T people are following suit." The I-T officers association took umbrage at these remarks and demanded an apology.

Eventually, in May 2013, the Income Tax department assessed that Gadkari's firms had evaded Rs. 70 million via such benami investments and other practices. On 30 April. 2014, then Congress union Minister Manish Tewari apologised to Nitin Gadkari when he was dragged in to a defamation suit by the latter. This apology was based on the judicial commission mention that Gadkari had played no role or had no concern with the scam. On 13 May 2014, the Income Tax department of Maharashtra state cleared Nitin Gadkari's name and gave him a clean chit saying there is no investigation presently pending.

Personal life
Nitin Gadkari is married to Kanchan Gadkari and they have three children, Nikhil, Sarang and Ketki. His eldest son Nikhil is married to Rutuja Pathak and Sarang Gadkari is married to Madhura Rodi. Gadkari family follows a vegetarian diet.

Controversies

In August 2019 Gadkari created controversy when he stated that he had advised the then Union Finance Minister to sack the RBI Governor because the latter was inflexible and adamant.

In 2009, seven-year-old Yogita Thakre was found dead with bruises all over her body in a car allegedly owned by Nitin Gadkari and parked near his home. Maharashtra's Criminal Investigation Department (CID) tried twice to close the case, but was rejected by local courts. Mr Gadkari's employees claimed that the girl accidentally locked herself in the boot of the car and died of suffocation. The girl's mother, however, claimed she was murdered. Yogita's post-mortem report said that she was smothered to death.

See also
 Make in India

References

Citations

Sources

External links

 Biography Profile at Lok Sabha, Parliament of India
 Official website (personal)

 

1956 births
Living people
Politicians from Nagpur
Rashtriya Swayamsevak Sangh pracharaks
Bharatiya Janata Party politicians from Maharashtra
Presidents of Bharatiya Janata Party
India MPs 2014–2019
Members of the Maharashtra Legislative Council
Leaders of the Opposition in the Maharashtra Legislative Council
Members of the Cabinet of India
Lok Sabha members from Maharashtra
Narendra Modi ministry
Marathi politicians
India MPs 2019–present
National Democratic Alliance candidates in the 2019 Indian general election